The 2010-11 Bermudian Premier Division is the 48th season of the highest competitive football league in Bermuda, which was founded in 1963. Dandy Town Hornets are the defending champions, having won their fifth league championship last season.

Teams
Hamilton Parish and Somerset Trojans were relegated to the Bermuda First Division after finishing last season in ninth and tenth place. They were replaced by the top two clubs from the First Division, St. David's Warriors and St. George's Colts.

Rams' Robinson and Zebras' Smith murdered
Just four days after the final round of matches, North Village Rams midfielder Randy Robinson was killed by gunfire. A month later, on 1 May, PHC Zebras striker Jason Smith was shot dead  . Both players were only 22 years old.

League  table

Results

Top scorers

Ref:

Season awards
The nominees for the Player Of The Year were:
Ralph Bean - North Village
Damon Ming - Dandy Town
Cecoy Robinson - PHC

Young Player of the Year
Jason Lee - North Village
Jahron Dickinson - St George’s
Tumani Steede - Devonshire Cougars

Coach of the Year
Shaun Goater - North Village
Richard Todd - St George’s
Kwame Steede - Devonshire Cougars

References

External links
 Bermuda Football Association

Bermudian Premier Division seasons
Bermudia
1